The 1982 season was the Chicago Bears' strike shortened 63rd season in the National Football League, and their first under head coach Mike Ditka.  The team failed to improve on their 6–10 record from 1981 to finish at 3–6 and failed to make the playoffs for the third consecutive season.

The strike also prevented the Bears–Packers rivalry from being played this year, making the Lions–Packers rivalry the longest-running annual series in the league.

Offseason

Transactions

Signings 
After the draft, the Bears signed 2 undrafted free agents, linebacker Dan Rains from Cincinnati and running back Calvin Thomas of Illinois.

1982 NFL Draft

Roster

Regular season

Schedule 

Note: Intra-division opponents are in bold text.

Standings

References 

 1982 Chicago Bears Season at www.bearshistory.com

Chicago Bears
Chicago Bears seasons
Chicago